The 2018 Grand Prix of Helsinki was held in Helsinki, Finland, from November 2–4. It was the third event of the 2018–19 ISU Grand Prix of Figure Skating, a senior-level international invitational competition series. Finland was chosen as the host after the Chinese Skating Association declined to host their annual Grand Prix event, the Cup of China. Medals were awarded in the disciplines of men's singles, ladies' singles, pair skating, and ice dancing. Skaters competed to earn points toward qualifying for the 2018–19 Grand Prix Final. Over 20,000 tickets were sold.

Entries
The ISU published the preliminary assignments on June 29, 2018.

Changes to preliminary assignments

Records 

The following new ISU best scores were set during this competition:

Results

Men

Ladies

Pairs

Ice dancing

References

External links
 2018 Grand Prix of Figure Skating
 Results

Helsinki
2018 in figure skating
2018 in Finnish sport
November 2018 sports events in Europe
International sports competitions in Helsinki
2010s in Helsinki